Oliver James Denham (born 4 May 2002) is a Welsh professional footballer who plays as a defender for EFL Championship club Cardiff City.

Club career
Denham began his career as a youth player with Manchester United before signing for Cardiff City in September 2020. He made his professional debut for the side as a substitute in place of Sean Morrison during a 2–0 defeat against Brighton & Hove Albion in the EFL Cup on 24 August 2021. Denham made his first start for Cardiff City in the FA Cup fourth round defeat against Liverpool on 6 February 2022.

International career
Denham was selected for the Wales under-21 squad for the EURO 2023 qualifying matches against Switzerland and Bulgaria on 25 and 29 March 2022.

On 24 May 2022, he was called up to the senior Wales squad for the  2022 FIFA World Cup qualifier play-off final against Ukraine on 5 June 2022 and the Nations League Group A matches against Poland, Netherlands, Belgium and the Netherlands again on 1 June, 8 June, 11 June and 14 June 2022 respectively.

Career statistics

References

External links
 

2002 births
Living people
Welsh footballers
Wales youth international footballers
English footballers
English people of Welsh descent
 Manchester United F.C. players
Association football defenders
Cardiff City F.C. players